Phytoecia griseomaculata is a species of beetle in the family Cerambycidae. It was described by Maurice Pic in 1891, originally as a varietas of the species Pilemia tigrina. It is known from Turkey and Syria.

References

Phytoecia
Beetles described in 1891